Saint-Firmin may refer to the following places in France:

 Saint-Firmin, Hautes-Alpes, a commune in the department of Hautes-Alpes
 Saint-Firmin, Meurthe-et-Moselle, a commune in the department of Meurthe-et-Moselle
 Saint-Firmin, Nièvre, a commune in the department of Nièvre
 Saint-Firmin, Saône-et-Loire, a commune in the department of Saône-et-Loire
 Saint-Firmin-des-Bois, a commune in the department of Loiret
 Saint-Firmin-des-Prés, a commune in the department of Loir-et-Cher
 Saint-Firmin-sur-Loire, a commune in the department of Loiret